Catocala maculata is a moth in the family Erebidae first described by Vincent in 1919. It is found in China.

References

maculata
Moths described in 1919
Moths of Asia